Sina Ibn Jamali, awc, psc is a retired lieutenant general of the Bangladesh Army. During his tenures he held the appointments of Director Military Operations, Adjutant General, Bangladesh Army, General Officer Commanding of 24 Infantry Division, Chittagong and the Chief of General Staff in Army Headquarters. He also served as the president of Bangladesh Cricket Board from August 2007 to September 2009. Currently he is serving as Corporate Adviser at Radiant Pharmaceuticals Ltd, MD & CEO of Radiant Nutraceuticals Ltd, Radiant Distribution Ltd and Pharmacil Ltd.

Education 
Sina Ibn Jamali, studied at Mirzapur Cadet College. He completed Masters of Defense Studies (MDS) and graduate of Defense Services Command and Staff College, Mirpur; ‘Staff College’ Quetta, Pakistan and ‘Army War College’ of USA.

Career 
He commanded two Infantry Battalions, an Infantry Brigade and an infantry division. He took part in counter insurgency operations in Chittagong Hill-Tracts.

On December 24, 2005 he replaced Major General Iqbal Karim Bhuiyan as the General Officer Commanding (GOC) of 24 Infantry Division, Chittagong. Before that he served as Adjutant General of the army.

He held the honor of being the Colonel Commandant of ‘Corps of Military Police’ of Bangladesh Army. From 14 May 2009 to 31 Oct 2009 he served as the Commandant of National Defense College.

He was appointed as chief of general staff of the Bangladesh Army by the previous military caretaker government when they dissolved the existing board.

He was appointed  chairman of the Local Organising Committee for the 2011 Cricket World Cup in July 2009. The Bangladesh cricket team won their first test series against the West Indies during his presidency, in July 2009.

References

Bangladeshi cricket administrators
Living people
Bangladesh Army generals
Year of birth missing (living people)